Dousland railway station, originally opened at Dousland Barn in 1883 was located on the 10.5 mile long single track branch railway line in Devon, England, running from Yelverton to Princetown with eventually four intermediate stops, three being halts and one at Dousland as a fully fledged station.

History
The branch line was authorised in 1878 and opened on 11 August 1883. On opening the line ran from  through Dousland to Princetown, however in 1885  was opened and replaced Horrabridge as the start of the line . Much of the route followed the course of the old Plymouth and Dartmoor Railway. The freight traffic on the branch line included granite from the rail served quarries of Swelltor and Foggintor which were closed in 1906.

Owned by the Princetown Railway until 1 January 1922, the company then merged with the Great Western Railway (GWR). The line passed to British Railways (Western Region) in 1948 and closed on 3 March 1956.

The station did not have a passing loop being only a block post splitting the line into two sections. It had a goods yard, signal box, goods shed, and a level crossing with gates. The signal box near the level crossing was replaced by a signal box located on the platform in 1915. The signal box was renamed Dousland from Dousland Barn.

Much of the old track formation now forms the route of the Dousland to Princetown Railway Track, Dousland station house survives as a private dwelling and the platform is still visible.

There was a proposal reported in the Western Evening Herald in 1956 by a Mr P Morshead, supported by Lydford Parish Council, to purchase the track, re-lay it to narrow gauge and use three narrow gauge tank locomotives to run trains between Yelverton and Dousland in order to earn money to reopen the remainder of the line.

Services

References
Notes

Sources
 Atterbury, P. (2006) Branch Line Britain: A Nostalgic Journey Celebrating a Golden Age. Newton Abbot : David & Charles.
 Butt, R. V. J. (1995). The Directory of Railway Stations: details every public and private passenger station, halt, platform and stopping place, past and present (1st ed.). Sparkford: Patrick Stephens Ltd. . OCLC 60251199.
 Mitchell, David (1994). British Railways Past and Present - Devon. Wadenhoe : Past and Present. .

External links
Dousland to Princetown Railway Track Walk

Disused railway stations in Devon
Railway stations in Great Britain opened in 1883
Railway stations in Great Britain closed in 1956
Former Great Western Railway stations